Johann Nepomuk Georg Egger (15 May 1804, in Salzburg – 19 March 1866, in Vienna), was an Austrian entomologist who specialised in Diptera.

Egger was a court physician in Vienna.
Egger wrote only one scientific papers  but this is an important reference.
His collection is conserved in Naturhistorisches Museum in Vienna.

Works
Egger, J. (1856). Neue Dipteren-Gattungen und Arten aus der Familie der Tachinarien und Dexiarien nebst einigen andern dipterologischen Verhandlungen des Zoologisch-Botanischen Vereins in Wien 6: 383-392
Egger, J. (1858). "Dipterologische Beiträge". Verhandlungen der Kaiserlich-Königlichen Zoologisch-Botanischen Gesellschaft in Wien. 8: 701–716.

References

Nonveiller, G. 1999: The Pioneers of the research on the Insects of Dalmatia. - Zagreb, Hrvatski Pridodoslovni Muzej : 1-390
Schiner, J. R. 1867: [Egger, J.]  Verh. k.-k. zool.-bot. Ges. Wien, Sitzungsber., Wien 17 	531-540, Portrait online here

Austrian entomologists
Dipterists
1804 births
1866 deaths